Rho Pegasi, Latinized from ρ Pegasi, is a star in the northern constellation of Pegasus, near the southern constellation boundary with Pisces. This is a probable astrometric binary system, as determined by changes to the proper motion of the visible component. It has a white hue and is faintly visible to the naked eye with an apparent visual magnitude of 4.90. The system is located at a distance of approximately 274 light years from the Sun based on parallax, but it is drifting closer with a radial velocity of −10.6 km/s.

This visible component is an A-type main-sequence star with a stellar classification of A1V. The star is 331 million years old and is spinning with a projected rotational velocity of 107 km/s. It has 2.8 times the mass of the Sun and 3.1 times the Sun's radius. The star is radiating 110 times the luminosity of the Sun from its photosphere at an effective temperature of 9,484 K.

References

A-type main-sequence stars
Astrometric binaries

Pegasus (constellation)
Pegasi, Rho
BD+08 4961
Pegasi, 50
216735
113186
8717